The 2002 ICF Canoe Sprint World Championships were held in Seville, Spain.

The men's competition consisted of nine Canadian (single paddle, open boat) and nine kayak events. Women competed in nine events, all in kayak.

This was the 32nd championships in canoe sprint.

Doping controversy
Dmitiry Sabin of Ukraine won the silver in the C-1 200 m event, but was disqualified when he tested positive for doping. Sabin became the first person to fail a doping test in canoe sprint at an Olympic or world championship level though he did compete at the following year's world championships.

Medal summary

Men's
 Non-Olympic classes

Canoe

Kayak

Women's
 Non-Olympic classes

Kayak

Medal table

References
ICF medalists for Olympic and World Championships - Part 1: flatwater (now sprint): 1936-2007.
ICF medalists for Olympic and World Championships - Part 2: rest of flatwater (now sprint) and remaining canoeing disciplines: 1936-2007.

C
C
ICF Canoe Sprint World Championships
C
Canoeing and kayaking competitions in Spain